"If I Go" is a 2008 song by Anouk written by Anouk Teeuwe, Leendert Haaksma, and Bart van Veen.

Charts
The song reached No.15 in the Dutch charts.

Weekly charts

Year-end charts

References

Anouk (singer) songs
2008 singles
2007 songs
EMI Records singles
Song recordings produced by Glen Ballard
Songs written by Anouk (singer)